is a Japanese manga series written by Kazuo Koike and illustrated by Ryoichi Ikegami. It was serialized in Shogakukan's seinen manga magazine Big Comic Spirits from 1982 to 1986. A 5-episode original video animation (OVA) adaptation produced by Madhouse and Magic Bus and directed by Toshio Takeuchi was released from July 1986 to August 1988.

Media

Manga
Written by Kazuo Koike and illustrated by Ryoichi Ikegami, Wounded Man was serialized in Shogakukan's seinen manga magazine Big Comic Spirits from 1982 to 1986. Shogakukan collected its chapters in eleven tankōbon volumes.

ComicsOne published the manga in English in 9 volumes.

OVA
A 5-episode original video animation (OVA) adaptation, produced by Madhouse and Magic Bus, was released from July 5, 1986, to August 25, 1988.

References

Further reading

External links
 

ComicsOne titles
Madhouse (company)
Magic Bus (studio)
Ryoichi Ikegami
Seinen manga
Shogakukan manga